Perry A. Stambaugh (born March 8, 1960) is a Republican member of the Pennsylvania House of Representatives, District 86. He first took office following the 2020 Pennsylvania House of Representatives election.

Stambaugh graduated from Penn State University and operates a family farm in Green Park, Pennsylvania, Perry County. A lifetime member of the National Rifle Association, he supports measures that will greatly increase rural residents’ access to high-speed Internet service as well as state constitutional reforms, such as electing state appellate judges on a district (not statewide) basis and eliminating property taxes to fund schools. He also backs state legislative and congressional term limits.

Career
Before running for the state House, Stambaugh spent most of his nearly 40-year professional career as a rural and agricultural magazine editor on local, statewide, and national levels—notably with the former Pennsylvania Farmer magazine (now American Agriculturist); Penn Lines magazine, published by the Pennsylvania Rural Electric Association; and RE Magazine, produced by the National Rural Electric Cooperative Association.

Stambaugh currently sits on the Commerce, Environmental Resources & Energy, and Labor & Industry committees.

References

External links

1960 births
Living people
Republican Party members of the Pennsylvania House of Representatives
People from Perry County, Pennsylvania
People from Harrisburg, Pennsylvania
Pennsylvania State University alumni
21st-century American politicians